Amnestus pusillus is a species of burrowing bug in the family Cydnidae. It is found in the Caribbean Sea, Central America, and North America.

References

Cydnidae
Articles created by Qbugbot
Insects described in 1876